Kachali or Kacholi may refer to:
 Khumbo Kachali (born 1966), Malawian politician